Route 370 is a  long east–west secondary highway in the northeast portion of New Brunswick, Canada.

The route's north-eastern terminus is in the community of Tracadie–Sheila. The road starts off known as Rue-Lois G. Daigle traveling west to the community of Upper Sheila.  Here the road crosses the Tracadie River 2x before entering the community of Leech.  Here the road takes a 90 degree turn south crossing the Tracadie River again entering the community of Pont-Lafrance.  The road continues south before turning east crossing the Tracadie River one last time to the  Riviere-du-Portage.

Intersecting routes
None

See also

References

370
370